Scott Parkinson (born 27 November 1983) is an English football manager and former player who played as a defender. He is currently the head assistant coach for OL Reign of the American National Women's Soccer League (NWSL).

College career 
Parkinson was an All-American player for the USAO Drovers men's soccer team.

Club career 
Parkinson captained Oklahoma City FC during their inaugural season in 2013.

Managerial career 
Parkinson joined the professional ranks in 2018 as an assistant coach for the NWSL expansion team Utah Royals FC. He left for the same position at Chicago Red Stars in 2020.

On 31 August 2021, Parkinson was named the head coach of NWSL team NJ/NY Gotham FC through 2022. On 11 August 2022, after a  start of the 2022 NWSL regular season, Gotham FC announced that the club and Parkinson had "parted ways" and would seek a new coach for the 2023 season.

Career statistics

Managerial

Personal life 
Parkinson is from Liverpool, and attended Wade Deacon High School. He is married to Lauren Parkinson.

References

External links 
 
 Blog Scott Parkinson
 USAO Drovers profile

1983 births
Living people
English expatriate football managers
English expatriate footballers
NJ/NY Gotham FC coaches
English football managers
English footballers
Association football defenders
English expatriate sportspeople in the United States
Expatriate soccer players in the United States
Expatriate soccer managers in the United States
Utah Royals FC coaches
National Women's Soccer League coaches
Utah Royals FC non-playing staff
Chicago Red Stars non-playing staff
OL Reign non-playing staff
Reading United A.C. players
Oklahoma City FC players
USL League Two players
National Premier Soccer League players
USAO Drovers men's soccer players
High school soccer coaches in the United States
Footballers from Liverpool
Oklahoma Wesleyan Eagles and Lady Eagles soccer
Rogers State Hillcats soccer
Rogers State Hillcats coaches